Camilo Ponce Enríquez Canton is a canton of Ecuador, located in the Azuay Province.  The capital lies at Camilo Ponce Enríquez.

Demographics
Ethnic groups as of the Ecuadorian census of 2010:
Mestizo  85.2%
White  6.6%
Afro-Ecuadorian  5.5%
Montubio  1.9%
Indigenous  0.6%
Other  0.3%

References

Cantons of Azuay Province